The following is an episode list for the television series Chorlton and the Wheelies. The first episode originally aired in the United Kingdom and New Zealand on 27 September 1976, and the programme ran for three series over three years. The final episode aired on 18 December 1978.

Chorlton and the Wheelies was an animated children's television series that followed the adventures of Chorlton, a happiness dragon, in Wheelie World.

Episodes

Series Overview

Series 1 (1976)

Series 2 (1977)

Christmas Special (1977)

Series 3 (1978)

References 

Chorlton and the Wheelies